The 2019 Mountain West Conference football season, part of that year's NCAA Division I FBS football season, is the 21st season of College Football for the Mountain West Conference (MW) since 2012. 12 teams have competed in the MW-football conference. The season began on August 24, 2019, and will end on November 30. The entire schedule was released on February 4, 2019.

Previous season

In 2018 Boise State won the Mountain Division with a 7–1 Conference record, while Fresno State won the West Division with a 7–1 Conference Record. Fresno State beat Boise State 19–16 in Overtime in the 2018 Mountain West Conference Championship football game, held at Albertsons Stadium in Boise.

Preseason

Mountain West Media
The Mountain West Media Days took place on July 23 and 24 at the Cosmopolitan.

Preseason Polls

First place votes in parenthesis

Preseason All–Mountain West team

Preseason Offensive Player of the Year:
Jordan Love, Jr., QB, Utah State
Preseason Defensive Player of the Year:
Curtis Weaver, Jr., DL, Boise State
Preseason Special Teams Player of the Year:
Cooper Rothe, Sr., PK, Wyoming

(* – member of the 2018 All–Mountain West first team)

(** – member of the 2018 All–Mountain West second team)

Rankings

Listed are the Mountain West teams who were ranked or received votes at some point during the season. Colorado State, Nevada, New Mexico, San Jose State, and UNLV were never ranked nor received any votes.

Coaches

Coaching changes
There was only one coaching change in the Mountain West Conference for the 2019 season.

Gary Andersen, who previously coached at Utah State, returned to Logan to replace Matt Wells, who left to coach at Texas Tech.

Schedule
The Regular season will begin on August 24 and will end on November 30.

Regular season

Week One

Week Two

Week Three

Week Four

Week Five

Week Six

Week Seven

Week Eight

Week Nine

Week Ten

Week Eleven

Week Twelve

Week Thirteen

Week Fourteen

Championship Game

Week Fifteen (Mountain West Championship game)

The 2019 Mountain West Conference Championship Game was held on December 7 between the champions of the Mountain Division and the West Division.

Postseason

Bowl games

Rankings are from CFP rankings.  All times Mountain Time Zone.  Mountain West teams shown in bold.

Selection of teams
Bowl eligible: Air Force, Boise State, Hawaii, Nevada, San Diego State, Utah State, Wyoming
Bowl-ineligible: Colorado State, Fresno State, New Mexico, San Jose State, UNLV

Mountain West records vs Other Conferences
2019–2020 records against non-conference foes:

Regular Season

Post Season

Mountain West vs Power Five matchups

This is a list of games the Mountain West has scheduled versus power conference teams (ACC, Big 10, Big 12, Pac-12, BYU/Notre Dame and SEC). All rankings are from the current AP Poll at the time of the game.

Mountain West vs Group of Five matchups
The following games include Mountain West teams competing against teams from the American, C-USA, MAC or Sun Belt.

Mountain West vs FBS independents matchups
The following games include Mountain West teams competing against FBS Independents, which includes Army, Liberty, New Mexico State, or UMass.

Mountain West vs FCS matchups

Awards and honors

Player of the week honors

Mountain West Individual Awards
The following individuals received postseason honors as voted by the Mountain West Conference football coaches at the end of the season

All-conference teams

All Conference Honorable Mentions
Air Force: Milton Bugg III, Jr., DB; Jeremy Fejedelem, Sr., DB; Jordan Jackson, Jr., DL; Timothy Jackson, So., FB; Jake Koehnke, Sr., PK; Zan Lewis, Sr., DB; Geraud Sanders, Sr., WR; Kadin Remsberg, Jr., RB
Boise State: John Bates, Jr., TE; Sonatane Lui, Sr., DL; Eric Quevedo, Sr., OL; Khalil Shakir, So., WR; Avery Williams, Jr., DB
Colorado State: Anthony Hawkins, Sr., KR; Manny Jones, Jr., DL
Fresno State: Kevin Atkins, Jr., DL; Blake Cusick, Sr., P; JuJu Hughes, Sr., DB
Hawaii: Cortez Davis, Jr., DB; Rojesterman Farris II, Sr., DB; Solomon Matautia, Sr., LB; Kaimana Padello, Sr., DL; Gene Pryor, OL; Taaga Tuulima, Jr., OL; Blessman Ta'ala, So., DL
Nevada: Daniel Brown, Sr., DB; Romeo Doubs, WR, PR; Gabriel Sewell, Sr., LB; Toa Taua, So., RB
New Mexico: Ahmari Davis, Sr., RB; Alex Hart, Sr., LB; Teton Saltes, Jr., OL; Kyle Stapley, Jr., OL
San Diego State: Matt Araiza, Fr., PK; William Dunkle, Fr., OL; Darren Hall, So., DB; Brandon Heicklen, Sr., P; Dwayne Johnson Jr., Jr., DB
San Jose State: Bailey Gaither, Sr., WR; Troy Kowalski, Sr., OL; Matt Mercurio, Fr., PK; Jack Snyder, Jr., OL
UNLV: Julio Garcia, Jr., OL; Rayshad Jackson, Sr., LB; Justin Polu, Sr., OL; Javin White, Sr., LB
Utah State: Shaq Bond, Jr., DB; Gerold Bright, Sr., RB; Jordan Love, Jr., QB; Caleb Repp, Sr., TE; Christopher Unga, Sr., DL
Wyoming: Tyler Hall, Sr., DB; Logan Harris, Jr., OL; Cassh Maluia, Sr., LB

All-Americans

The 2019 College Football All-America Teams are composed of the following College Football All-American first teams chosen by the following selector organizations: Associated Press (AP), Football Writers Association of America (FWAA), American Football Coaches Association (AFCA), Walter Camp Foundation (WCFF), The Sporting News (TSN), Sports Illustrated (SI), USA Today (USAT) ESPN, CBS Sports (CBS), FOX Sports (FOX) College Football News (CFN), Bleacher Report (BR), Scout.com, Phil Steele (PS), SB Nation (SB), Athlon Sports, Pro Football Focus (PFF) and Yahoo! Sports (Yahoo!).

Currently, the NCAA compiles consensus all-America teams in the sports of Division I-FBS football and Division I men's basketball using a point system computed from All-America teams named by coaches associations or media sources.  The system consists of three points for a first-team honor, two points for second-team honor, and one point for third-team honor.  Honorable mention and fourth team or lower recognitions are not accorded any points.  Football consensus teams are compiled by position and the player accumulating the most points at each position is named first team consensus all-American.  Currently, the NCAA recognizes All-Americans selected by the AP, AFCA, FWAA, TSN, and the WCFF to determine Consensus and Unanimous All-Americans. Any player named to the First Team by all five of the NCAA-recognized selectors is deemed a Unanimous All-American.

*AFCA All-America Team (AFCA)
*Walter Camp Football Foundation All-America Team (WCFF)
*Associated Press All-America Team (AP)
*The Sporting News All-America Team (TSN)
*Football Writers Association of America All-America Team (FWAA)
*Sports Illustrated All-America Team (SI)
*Bleacher Report All-America Team (BR)
*College Football News All-America Team (CFN)
*ESPN All-America Team (ESPN)
*CBS Sports All-America Team (CBS)
*Athlon Sports All-America Team (Athlon)

All-Academic

National award winners
2019 College Football Award Winners

Home game attendance

Bold – Exceed capacity
†Season High

NFL Draft

The following list includes all Mountain West players who were drafted in the 2020 NFL draft.

Notes

References